Alfred William Jones (6 August 1900 – 7 August 1986) was an English cricketer.  Jones was a left-handed batsman who bowled right-arm medium pace.  He was born at Tewkesbury, Gloucestershire.

Jones made a single first-class appearance for Northamptonshire against Sussex in the 1933 County Championship at the Town Ground, Peterborough.  He scored a single run in Northamptonshire's first-innings, before being dismissed by Albert Wensley, while in their second-innings he was dismissed for 12 by James Langridge.

He died at Orton Longueville, Cambridgeshire the day after his 86th birthday on 7 August 1986.

References

External links
Alfred Jones at ESPNcricinfo
Alfred Jones at CricketArchive

1900 births
1986 deaths
People from Tewkesbury
English cricketers
Northamptonshire cricketers
Sportspeople from Gloucestershire